The 1954 Navy Midshipmen football team represented the United States Naval Academy (USNA) as an independent during the 1954 college football season. The team was led by fifth-year head coach Eddie Erdelatz, and they acquired the nickname "Team Named Desire" during the press conference following the 25–0 road shutout of Stanford, when Erdelatz said, "Every man on this team is full of desire." 

After defeating #5 Army in Philadelphia, the Midshipmen were ranked fifth in both final polls, released in late November, and played in their first bowl game in 31 years. Navy shut out #6 Ole Miss 21–0 in the Sugar Bowl in New Orleans on New Year's Day.

Schedule

Personnel

Game summaries

Sugar Bowl vs Ole Miss

Welsh 8/14 passing
Gattuso (MVP) 111 rush yds, 2 TD
Weaver 106 rush yds, TD, 3 PAT

References

Navy
Navy Midshipmen football seasons
Lambert-Meadowlands Trophy seasons
Sugar Bowl champion seasons
Navy Midshipmen football